Antennaria lanata is a North American species of flowering plant in the family Asteraceae, known by the common name woolly pussytoes. It is native to western Canada (Alberta, British Columbia) and the northwestern United States (Oregon, Washington, Idaho, Montana, Wyoming, Utah, and extreme northern California (Del Norte and Trinity Counties)).

Antennaria lanata is a small herb up to 20 cm (8 inches) tall. Leaves are covered with thick white hairs resembling wool. It is dioecious, meaning that male and female flowers are borne on separate plants. It grows in protected alpine and subalpine sites in mountainous areas.

References

External links
Turner Photographics Wildflowers of the Pacific Northwest, 
Naturegate
Paul Slichter, Pussytoes of Mt. Adams Country, Woolly Everlasting, Woolly Pussytoes  Antennaria lanata
Electronic Atlas of the Flora of British Columbia
Calphotos Photo gallery, University of California

lanata
Flora of Western Canada
Plants described in 1834
Flora of the Northwestern United States
Flora of the Southwestern United States
Flora without expected TNC conservation status